Heiner Rodrigo Parra Bustamante (born 9 October 1991) is a Colombian professional racing cyclist, who currently rides for UCI Continental team .

Major results

2013
 Ronde de l'Isard
1st   Mountains classification 
1st Stage 3 
 5th Overall Tour Alsace
 7th Overall Tour de l'Avenir
2016
 1st  Mountains classification Vuelta a la Comunidad de Madrid
 5th Overall GP Internacional Beiras e Serra da Estrela
 6th Overall Vuelta a Asturias
2017
 1st Stage 8 Clásico RCN
2019
 1st Stage 9 Vuelta a Colombia
2021 
 9th Overall Vuelta a Colombia
2022
 5th Overall Tour of the Gila
1st   Mountains classification

References

External links
 

1991 births
Living people
Colombian male cyclists
Sportspeople from Boyacá Department
21st-century Colombian people